Being Incorporated, d.b.a. Being Giza Group, is a Japanese private entertainment conglomerate based in Tokyo's Roppongi district, founded on November 1, 1978 by musician Daiko Nagato. Being Inc. and its subsidiaries are the main supplier of theme music for the anime series Detective Conan. As of May 2011, 77 theme tunes have been supplied to the anime by Being Inc.

Labels
Nowadays production-based record company are no longer a rare thing, however Being has established a dedicated record company and label in quick succession since 1991. Label companies under the label companies that are part of Being Inc. are also subsequently owned by Being Inc. It includes indies labels as well.

Independent labels
Zain Records (1991,previously named as B.Jin)
VERMILLION RECORDS (1992, previously named as BMG ROOMS) - formerly a joint venture with BMG Japan (now Sony Music Entertainment Japan)
Giza Studio (1999)
B.Gram-Records (1991) - formerly a joint venture with Nippon PolyGram (now Universal Music Japan)
NORTHERN MUSIC (2007)
O-TOWN Jazz (2012, previously named as Giza Jazz)
D-Go (2012)
Being (2012)

Indies labels
Tent House(1999)
zazzy(2005)
magnifique(2008)
CRIMZON (2014)
Honey Bee Records (2016)

Former labels
Amemura-O-Town Record (1997)
BERG (1999)
pure:infinity (2010)
Styling Records (2003)
DAY TRACK (2003)

Artists

Other subsidiaries
Being Inc. owns the acting agent and talent management company White Dream.

Controversy
In June 2001, Being and its subsidiary B+U+M (now merged into Vermillion Records) was found to have failed to declare 840 million yen in income. They were acquitted after the investigation.

Creators
A large number of songwriters, composers and arrangers have enrolled at Being, Inc. Being, Inc.'s official website has listed in alphabetical order Being's Music Creators.

Songwriters

Azuki Nana (ex.Garnet Crow)
Uesugi Show (ex.Wands)
Koshi Inaba (B'z)
Maki Ohguro
U-ka Saegusa (ex.U-ka Saegusa in dB)
Miho Komatsu 
Izumi Sakai (Zard)
Daria Kawashima
Nobuteru Maeda (TUBE)
ROCKAKU (the creator of Being Inc., Daikou Nagato, using a pseudonym)
Mami Miyoshi (Rumania Montevideo)

Composers

Hiroshi Asai (ex. The Tambourines, Sensation)
Miho Komatsu
Koshi Inaba (B'z)
Maki Ohguro
Naoki Uzumoto (ex. DEEN)
Hitoshi Okamoto (ex. Garnet Crow)
Aika Ohno
Shinichirou Ohta (Doa (Japanese band)|doa)
Daria Kawashima
Masazumi Ozawa (ex. Pamelah)
Kouji Gotou (Zyyg)
Seiichirou Kuribayashi
Tetsurō Oda
Akihito Tokunaga (doa)
Yoshio Tatano
Hiroshi Terao
Tak Matsumoto (B'z)
Yuri Nakamura (ex. Garnet Crow)
Makoto Miyoshi (Rumania Montevideo)

Arrangers

Hirohito Furui (ex. Garnet Crow)
Hitoshi Okamoto (ex.Garnet Crow)
Yoshinobu Ohga (Sensation)
Akihito Tokunaga (doa (Japanese band))
Masazumi Ozawa (ex.Pamelah)
Masao Akashi
Daisuke Ikeda (arranger)
Takeshi Hayama
Satoru Kobayashi
Koji Gotou

References

External links
 
 
 Being Inc.'s channel on Nico Nico Douga

 
Mass media companies based in Tokyo
Mass media companies established in 1978
Entertainment companies of Japan
Labels distributed by CJ E&M Music and Live
Japanese companies established in 1978
Conglomerate companies of Japan
Entertainment companies established in 1978